Jawahar Navodaya Vidyalaya, Kullu or locally known as JNV Bandrol is a boarding, co-educational school in Kullu district of Himachal Pradesh state in India. Navodaya Vidyalayas are funded by the Indian Ministry of Human Resources Development and administered  by Navodaya Vidyalaya Smiti, an autonomous body under the ministry.

History 
The school was established in 1991, and is a part of Jawahar Navodaya Vidyalaya schools. The school shifted to permanent campus in August 2007, located at Bandrol, Kullu. This school is administered and monitored by Chandigarh regional office of Navodaya Vidyalaya Smiti.

Admission 
Admission to JNV Kullu at class VI level is made through selection test conducted by Navodaya Vidyalaya Smiti. The information about test is disseminated and advertised in the district by the office of Kullu district magistrate (Collector), who is also chairperson of Vidyalya Management Committee.

Affiliations 
JNV Kullu is affiliated to Central Board of Secondary Education with affiliation number 640012, following the curriculum prescribed by CBSE.

See also 

 List of JNV schools
 Jawahar Navodaya Vidyalaya, Mandi
 Jawahar Navodaya Vidyalaya, Bilaspur

References

External links 

 Official Website of JNV Kullu

High schools and secondary schools in Himachal Pradesh
Kullu
Educational institutions established in 1991
1991 establishments in Himachal Pradesh
Kullu district